Cool Cats Show was an Australian television series that aired live on Melbourne station HSV-7 from 1958 to 1960. When it debuted Australian series often aired on a single station, but this was becoming less common during the run of the series, as more shows began being shown in several cities as television spread across the country. The series is notable as an early example of an Australian television series aimed at teenagers. TV listings of the era described it as a "teenage studio dance" hosted by Don Bennetts with guest artists. The Ted Vining Trio is listed as appearing in several episodes.

It is not known if kinescope recordings exist of the series.

References

External links

Seven Network original programming
1958 Australian television series debuts
1960 Australian television series endings
Australian music television series
Black-and-white Australian television shows
English-language television shows
Pop music television series